Weightlifting at the 2019 African Games was held from 25 to 30 August 2019 in Rabat, Morocco.

The event served as a qualifier for the 2020 Summer Olympics in Tokyo, Japan.

Later five Egyptian athletes were disqualified due to anti-doping violations.

Participating nations

Medal table

Medal summary

Men

Women

References

External links 
 Weightlifting
 Results

2019 African Games
African Games
Weightlifting competitions in Morocco
2019